Harpactognathus (meaning "seizing/grasping jaw") is a genus of pterosaur found in the Late Jurassic-age Morrison Formation of Albany County, Wyoming, United States. It is based on NAMAL 101, a partial skull consisting of the snout, recovered from near Bone Cabin Quarry in 1996. The specific name honors the discoverer, Joe Gentry, a volunteer for the Western Paleontological Laboratories, in Lehi, Utah.

The holotype of Harpactognathus consists of a partial rostrum. Its describers found it to be most similar to Scaphognathus among pterosaurs, albeit substantially larger (estimated skull length of 280–300 mm (11–12 in), estimated wingspan of at least 2.5 m (8.2 ft). Because of the similarity, Harpactognathus was assigned to the subfamily Scaphognathinae of the family Rhamphorhynchidae. This genus is also notable for having a low bony crest running all the way to the tip of the beak (pterosaur bone crests usually do not reach the tip) and for being the oldest known Morrison Formation pterosaur, having been found in the Salt Wash Member (Kimmeridgian).

Paleobiology
The authors hypothesized that Scaphognathines specialized as aerial predators in inland freshwater habitats. However, more recent publications have suggested scaphognathines lacked specializations for piscivory, and were likely terrestrial predators of small vertebrates or corvid-like generalists.

See also

 List of pterosaur genera
 Timeline of pterosaur research

References

Rhamphorhynchids
Late Jurassic pterosaurs of North America
Morrison fauna
Taxa named by Kenneth Carpenter
Fossil taxa described in 2003